The Guitar Artistry of Charlie Byrd is an album by American jazz guitarist Charlie Byrd featuring tracks recorded in 1960 and  released on the Riverside label in 1963. The album was first released on the Washington Records Offbeat imprint as Charlie's Choice: Jazz at the Showboat, Vol. 4 but only received limited distribution prior to Byrd signing with Riverside.

Reception

Allmusic awarded the album 4½ stars stating "The melodic music is pleasing (if not too substantial), predictable and reasonably enjoyable".

Track listing
 "Taking a Chance on Love" (Vernon Duke, Ted Fetter, John Latouche) - 1:57     
 "Moonlight in Vermont" (John Blackburn, Karl Suessdorf) - 2:53     
 "Speak Low" (Ogden Nash, Kurt Weill) - 3:47     
 "Nuages" (Django Reinhardt) - 3:04     
 "Ev'rything I've Got" (Lorenz Hart, Richard Rodgers) - 2:22     
 "Makin' Whoopee" (Walter Donaldson, Gus Kahn) - 2:45     
 "Django" (John Lewis) - 3:25     
 "Nice Work If You Can Get It" (George Gershwin, Ira Gershwin) - 1:49     
 "The House of the Rising Sun" (Traditional) - 5:30     
 "Ring Them Harmonics" (Keter Betts) - 3:51     
 "Taboo" (Margarita Lecuona, Bob Russell) - 9:45     
 "To Ginny" (Charlie Byrd) - 5:25

Personnel 
Charlie Byrd - guitar
Keter Betts - bass 
Buddy Deppenschmidt - drums

References 

1963 albums
Charlie Byrd albums
Riverside Records albums